The 9th European Cross Country Championships were held at Medulin in Croatia on 8 December 2002. Serhiy Lebid took his third title in the men's competition and Helena Javornik won the women's race.

Results

Men individual 9.83 km

Total 86 competitors

Men teams

Total 13 teams

Women individual 6.17 km

Total 78 competitors

Women teams

Total 12 teams

Junior men individual 6.17 km

Total 93 competitors

Junior men teams

Total 18 teams

Junior women individual 3.73 km

Total 93 competitors

Junior women teams

Total 17 teams

References

External links
 Database containing all results between 1994–2007

European Cross Country Championships
European Cross Country Championships
European Cross Country Championships
International athletics competitions hosted by Croatia
Cross country running in Croatia
European Cross Country Championships